Hasanabad-e KorgheSang (also Romanized as Ḩasanābād-e KorgheSang, Ḩasanābād-e KorogheSang, Ḩasanābād KorgheSang, and Ḩasanābād KorgheSang; also known as Hasanābād, Hasan abade, and KorgheSang) is a village in Arabkhaneh Rural District, Shusef District, Nehbandan County, South Khorasan Province, Iran. At the 2006 census, its population was 93, in 29 families.

References 

Populated places in Nehbandan County